Brad A. Oberhousen (born February 22, 1978) is an American Democratic politician. From 2012 to 2016 he served as a member of the Mississippi House of Representatives from the 73rd District, having been elected in 2011.

References

1978 births
Living people
Politicians from Jackson, Mississippi
Democratic Party members of the Mississippi House of Representatives